Kelsy Karter (born 1 August 1991) is a singer-songwriter from New Zealand. She is best known for her viral publicity stunt in which she supposedly tattooed a picture of Harry Styles on her face to promote her new single "Harry".

Early life 
Kelsy Karter moved to Australia when she was young, and grew up between the Gold Coast and Los Angeles. She was "born into a family of jazz musicians" and began songwriting at age 16. In 2012, she moved to Los Angeles to pursue a singing, dancing and acting career. She now lives with her dog Lennon, named after John Lennon. In her downtime, she enjoys playing poker and cooking.

Karter's background is in musical theatre, Motown and jazz; however, her genre is rock and roll and punk. Her musical inspirations include David Bowie, Amy Winehouse, James Brown, Sam Cooke, Mick Jagger and Freddie Mercury.

Career 
Karter's debut single "Children Of My Hometown" was released in 2015. After her infamous fake tattoo, she rose to international fame with her single, "Harry". In 2019, her song "Blast Off" was featured on season 4, episode 11 of the comedy drama television series The Bold Type. 

On 2 October 2020, her debut album Missing Person was released. Produced by Zakk Cervini and Chris Greatti, Karter wrote the album after the death of a loved one and a breakup, stating "I was so depressed and broke, and probably at the lowest point in my whole life. For a while I sort of lost myself, which is why the album's called Missing Person..." Her single "God Knows I've Tried" from the album was featured in Rolling Stone as a 'Song You Need to Know'.

Karter has directed many of her music videos and has toured the US and UK several times fronting her band "Kelsy Karter & The Heroines".

Karter sings about her anxieties, relationships, identity, and rebellion against conformity. Her music is imbued with themes of staying true to yourself and embracing your individuality and uniqueness. She describes her relationship with her fans as a "partnership". She says, "I want them to feel strong in their individuality, and to stop caring about what other people think. I hope it helps them to feel both totally vulnerable and completely invincible at the very same time."

In 2019 she opened for The Struts, and has since toured with The Glorious Sons and The Hunna.

Discography

Studio albums

EPs

Singles

References 

Musicians from Auckland
Musicians from Gold Coast, Queensland
New Zealand emigrants to the United States
Australian alternative rock musicians
New Zealand emigrants to Australia
New Zealand women singer-songwriters
21st-century New Zealand women musicians
1991 births
Living people